Øvrevatnet or Øvervatnet is a lake that lies in Fauske Municipality in Nordland county, Norway. The  lake flows out into the neighboring lake Nedrevatnet to the west.

See also
 List of lakes in Norway
 Geography of Norway

References

Lakes of Nordland
Fauske